Yadrintsevskya Street is a street in Tsentralny City District of Novosibirsk, Russia. The street runs from the T-shaped intersection with Krasny Avenue, crosses Kamenskaya, Michurin and Shamshin Family streets, then branches into three streets: Potaninsky Lane, Yadrintsevsky Konny Spusk and Olga Zhilina Street.

History
The street was named after Nikolai Yadrintsev, Russian public figure, explorer, archaeologist, and turkologist.

Architecture
 Yadrintsevskaya Street 25 is a two-story building. It was built in 1911.
 Totorin House is a two-story building. It was built in 1912.
 City School Building. It was built in 1912. Architect: Andrey Kryachkov.
 Aeroflot House is a constructivist building on the corner of Krasny Avenue and Yadrintsevskaya Street. It was built in the 1930s.

Educational institutions
 Novosibirsk State Theater Institute
 Novosibirsk State University of Economics and Management

Notable residents
 Yanka Dyagileva was a Russian poet, singer-songwriter and punk rock singers. She lived on the corner of Yadrintsevskaya and Shamshin Family streets. In 2014 a memorial plaque was installed on the building.

References

Tsentralny City District, Novosibirsk
Streets in Novosibirsk